Alzou may refer to the following rivers in France:

Alzou (Ouysse), tributary of the Ouysse, in the Lot department
Alzou (Aveyron), tributary of the Aveyron, in the Aveyron department